Yagodina is a rural locality (a village) in Yorgvinskoye Rural Settlement, Kudymkarsky District, Perm Krai, Russia. The population was 43 as of 2010.

Geography 
Yagodina is located 21 km north of Kudymkar (the district's administrative centre) by road. Pronina is the nearest rural locality.

References 

Rural localities in Kudymkarsky District